Saint-Cyr refers to the popular child-saint Saint Quiricus (Cyriacus), whose following was strong in France because relics were brought back from Antioch by the 4th-century Bishop Saint Amator of Auxerre.   

Saint-Cyr may refer to:

Places

France
 École spéciale militaire de Saint-Cyr, a French military academy; Saint-Cyr is a common name for the academy
 École de Saint-Cyr, a boarding school for girls founded in 1684 by Madame de Maintenon
 Saint-Cyr, Ardèche, in the department of Ardèche
 Saint-Cyr, Haute-Vienne, in the department of Haute-Vienne
 Saint-Cyr, Manche, in the department of Manche
 Saint-Cyr, Saône-et-Loire, in the department of Saône-et-Loire
 Saint-Cyr, Vienne, in the department of Vienne
 Saint-Cyr-au-Mont-d'Or, in the department of Rhône
 Saint-Cyr-de-Favières, in the department of Loire
 Saint-Cyr-de-Salerne, in the department of Eure
 Saint-Cyr-des-Gâts, in the department of Vendée
 Saint-Cyr-de-Valorges, in the department of Loire
 Saint-Cyr-du-Bailleul, in the department of Manche
 Saint-Cyr-du-Doret, in the department of Charente-Maritime
 Saint-Cyr-du-Gault, in the department of Loir-et-Cher
 Saint-Cyr-du-Ronceray, in the department of Calvados
 Saint-Cyr-en-Arthies, in the department of Val-d'Oise
 Saint-Cyr-en-Bourg, in the department of Maine-et-Loire
 Saint-Cyr-en-Pail, in the department of Mayenne
 Saint-Cyr-en-Talmondais, in the department of Vendée
 Saint-Cyr-en-Val, in the department of Loiret
 Saint-Cyr-la-Campagne, in the department of Eure
 Saint-Cyr-la-Lande, in the department of Deux-Sèvres
 Saint-Cyr-la-Rivière, in the department of Essonne
 Saint-Cyr-la-Roche, in the department of Corrèze
 Saint-Cyr-la-Rosière, in the department of Orne
 Saint-Cyr-le-Chatoux, in the department of Rhône
 Saint-Cyr-l'École, in the department of Yvelines, the city where the military academy was initially located
 Saint-Cyr-le-Gravelais, in the department of Mayenne
 Saint-Cyr-les-Champagnes, in the department of Dordogne
 Saint-Cyr-les-Colons, in the department of Yonne
 Saint-Cyr-les-Vignes, in the department of Loire
 Saint-Cyr-Montmalin, in the department of Jura
 Saint-Cyr-sous-Dourdan, in the department of Essonne
 Saint-Cyr-sur-le-Rhône, in the department of Rhône
 Saint-Cyr-sur-Loire, in the department of Indre-et-Loire
 Saint-Cyr-sur-Menthon, in the department of Ain
 Saint-Cyr-sur-Mer, in the department of Var
 Saint-Cyr-sur-Morin, in the department of Seine-et-Marne

Canada
Saint-Cyr River (Ottawa River),  a tributary of the Ottawa River in Quebec
Saint-Cyr River (Opawica River), a tributary of Doda Lake in Quebec
Saint-Cyr River South, a tributary of the Mégiscane River in Quebec
Saint-Cyr Lake (Saint-Cyr River South), Quebec

United Kingdom
 Newton St Cyres, Devon

People
 Claude Carra Saint-Cyr (1760–1830), French general
 Claude Saint-Cyr (1911–2002), French fashion designer
 Jacques-Antoine de Révéroni Saint-Cyr (1767–1829), French man of letters
 Laurent, Marquis de Gouvion Saint-Cyr (1764–1830), Marshal of France
 Cyprian St Cyr, pseudonym of Eric Berne, Canadian-American psychoanalyst and founder of Transactional Analysis
 Lili St. Cyr (1918–1999), pseudonym of Willis Marie Van Schaac, prominent American burlesque stripper
 Adolphus Frederic St. Sure (1869–1949), United States District Judge.(name anglicized)
 John St. Cyr (1936-2022), American politician and judge

Other uses
 Immigration and Naturalization Service v. St. Cyr (2001), a U.S. Supreme Court case involving habeas corpus relief for deportable aliens
 The King's Daughters, English title of the 2000 French film Saint-Cyr